Petrúnella Skúladóttir (born 1 August 1985) is an Icelandic former basketball player and a former member of the Icelandic national basketball team. During her career, she won the Icelandic championship once, with Njarðvík in 2012, and the Icelandic Basketball Cup three times. She was named twice to the Úrvalsdeild Domestic All-First Team and was named the Icelandic Cup Finals MVP in 2015.

Playing career
Petrúnella started her senior team career with Grindavík in 1999. After receiving little playing time at the start of the 2004–05 season, she transferred to Njarðvík in November 2004. In January, she suffered an elbow injury that forced her to miss the rest of the season.

In 2008, she helped Grindavík to its first Icelandic Cup by posting 15 points, 10 rebounds and 6 assists in a 77–67 victory against Haukar in the Cup final.

After sitting out the 2010–11 season, Petrúnella joined Njarðvík again for the 2011–12 season. She had a standout season with Njarðvík, helping the team win both the national Cup and the national championship. After the season she was named to the Úrvalsdeild Domestic All-First Team.

In September 2012, Petrúnella signed back with Grindavík. After missing the 2013–14 season due to pregnancy, she had a strong comeback in 2014-15 and helped Grindavík to its second Icelandic Cup win after beating Keflavík in the Cup final. She was named the Icelandic Cup Finals MVP after posting 17 points, 10 rebounds and 5 steals in the win.

In the third game of the 2015–16 season, Petrúnella suffered a concussion and missed several weeks. She returned to average 10.1 points and 3.2 rebounds in 19 regular season games.

National team career
From 2004 to 2015, Petrúnella played 28 games for the Icelandic national basketball team. She competed three times with Iceland at the Games of the Small States of Europe.

Personal life
Petrúnella's younger sister is basketball player Hrund Skúladóttir.

References

External links
Icelandic statistics 2009–present at Icelandic Basketball Association

1985 births
Living people
Forwards (basketball)
Petrúnella Skúladóttir
Petrúnella Skúladóttir
Petrúnella Skúladóttir
Petrúnella Skúladóttir